Altaf is an Arabic surname and male given name. Notable people with this surname include:

Surname
 Chaudhry Farrukh Altaf, Pakistani politician
 Hina Altaf, Pakistani television actress, presenter and video jockey
 Makhdoom Altaf Ahmed (1944–1995), Pakistani politician
 Malik Jamshed Altaf, Pakistani politician
 Navjot Altaf, Indian artist
 Qazi Altaf Hussain (1920–1999), Indian soldier
 Saad Altaf (born 1983), Pakistani cricket player
 Saleem Altaf (born 1944), Pakistani cricket player
 Selim Altaf Gorge, Bangladesh politician
 Shahzad Altaf (born 1957), cricket player
 Syed Altaf Hossain (1923–1992), Bangladeshi politician
 Syed Mohid Altaf (born 1978), Indian politician
 Tanzeel Altaf (born 1991), Pakistani cricket player
 Tariq Altaf (1946–2001), Pakistani diplomat
 Zafar Altaf (1941–2015), Pakistani cricket player

Given name
 Altaf Ahmad Wani (born 1972), Indian politician
 Altaf Ahmed (born 1993), Pakistani cricket player
 Altaf Ali (born 1944), Bangladeshi politician
 Altaf Bukhari (born 1958), Indian politician
 Altaf Fatima (1927–2018), Pakistani author
 Altaf Gauhar (1923–2000), Pakistani civil servant, journalist, poet, and writer
 Altaf Hossain (Bangladeshi politician)
 Altaf Hossain Chowdhury, Bangladeshi politician
 Altaf Hossain Golandaz (1947–2007), Bangladeshi politician
 Altaf Husain (1900–1968), Pakistani educationist and journalist
 Altaf Hussain (East Pakistan cricketer) (1943–2019), Pakistani cricket player
 Altaf Hussain (Pakistani politician) (born 1953), Pakistani fugitive and politician
 Altaf Hussain (Welsh politician), British–Indian politician
 Altaf Hussain Hali (1837–1914), Indian Urdu poet
 Altaf Hussain Unar (1952–2014), Pakistani politician
 Altaf Khanani (born 1961), Pakistani fraudster and money launderer
 Altaf Mahmud (1933–1971), Bangladeshi freedom fighter
 Altaf Mazid, Indian filmmaker
 Altaf Qadri, Indian photojournalist
 Altaf Raja, Indian singer
 Altaf Shakoor, Pakistani politician
 Altaf Tyrewala (born 1977), Indian author and columnist
 Altaf Wani, Indian–American radiologist

Arabic given names
Arabic-language surnames